Tameside Radio is a radio station which broadcasts to the Tameside area of Greater Manchester. The station is based in Ashton-under-Lyne and broadcasts on 103.6 FM from its transmitter at Harrop Edge in Mottram.

History
Tameside Radio launched on 30 September 2007 and was acquired by social landlord New Charter Housing Trust in 2011, but owned by the independent company as Quest Media Network.

In 2017, it was granted a license extension from Ofcom to continue broadcasting until September 2022.

In January 2019, local businessman Chris Bird took over as Executive Chairman of Quest Media Network.

Programming

Weekday daytimes are presented by Alex Cann, Martin Emery and Mark Alston. The Evening Alternative is broadcast weekday evenings.

Weekend presenters include Andy Hoyle, Dan & Mark, Tim Fernley, Geoff Dorsett, Simon Harding, Mike Wallbank, Alex Cann, Rob Charles, Colin Hanslip and Emperor Rosko.

Tameside Radio broadcasts national and international news bulletins every hour, provided by Radio Newshub. On weekdays, the station broadcasts local news updates in partnership with the Tameside Reporter newspaper.

See also
List of radio stations in the United Kingdom

References

External links
Schedule, Quest Media Network 

Tameside
Radio stations in Manchester